Baker Omar Fallatah (born April 10, 1989) is a Saudi football player who plays as a striker for Al-Dahab. He played in the Pro League for Al-Qadisiyah and Al-Hazm.

References

1989 births
Living people
Saudi Arabian footballers
Al-Qadsiah FC players
Al-Hazem F.C. players
Al Safa FC players
Al-Tadamon SC (Saudi Arabia) players
Ohod Club players
Al-Fayha FC players
Al-Shoulla FC players
Najran SC players
Al-Watani Club players
Al-Majd Club players
Al-Hejaz Club players
Al-Entesar Club players
Al-Dahab Club players
Saudi Second Division players
Saudi First Division League players
Saudi Professional League players
Saudi Fourth Division players
Association football forwards